The name Songda has been used for four tropical cyclones in the Western North Pacific Ocean. The name was contributed by Vietnam, and is the name of the river Sông Đà in northwestern Vietnam.

 Typhoon Songda (2004) (T0418, 22W, Nina) – Category 4 typhoon, struck Japan.
 Typhoon Songda (2011) (T1102, 04W, Chedeng) – Category 5 super typhoon, brushed the southern tip of Japan.
 Typhoon Songda (2016) (T1620, 23W) – Category 4 super typhoon, reached its peak intensity southeast of Japan; later struck the Pacific Northwest region of the United States and Canada as a powerful extratropical storm.
 Tropical Storm Songda (2022) (T2205, 06W) – brought heavy rains to parts of the Korea Peninsula.

Pacific typhoon set index articles